The president of the Royal Society of Medicine is the head of the Royal Society of Medicine. The presidents were elected biennially by the Fellows of the Society up until 2014 when the charter changed. The presidents are now elected every three years.

The president oversees the running of the Society and chairs its council meetings. Almost all presidents have been nominated following many years' service to the Society.

List of presidents

References

 
Royal Society of Medicine
Presidents of the Royal Society of Medicine